Poyma is the name of several rural localities in Russia.

Modern localities
Poyma, Irkutsk Oblast, a village in Tayshetsky District of Irkutsk Oblast
Poyma, Primorsky Krai, a selo in Khasansky District of Primorsky Krai

Alternative names
Poyma, alternative name of Loyma, a selo in Loyma selo Administrative Territory of Priluzsky District in the Komi Republic;